Lord Bannatyne may refer to:

Iain Peebles, Lord Bannatyne
William Bannatyne, Lord Bannatyne